Batrachedra scapulata is a species of moth in the family Batrachedridae. It was described by Edward Meyrick in 1917 and is found in Sri Lanka.

References

Natural History Museum Lepidoptera generic names catalog

Batrachedridae
Moths described in 1917
Taxa named by Edward Meyrick
Moths of Sri Lanka